D-class lifeboats are a series of lifeboats operated by the Royal National Lifeboat Institution (RNLI).

Boats in this series include:

 D-class lifeboat (RFD PB16), an RNLI lifeboat
 D-class lifeboat (Avon S650),  a sub-class of inflatable boats operated as part of the D-class between 1971 and 1986 by the RNLI
 D-class lifeboat (Zodiac III), an RNLI lifeboat
 D-class lifeboat (EA16), a class of inflatable boat operated since 1987 by the RNLI
 D-class lifeboat (IB1), inflatable boats serving in the UK's RNLI inshore lifeboat (ILB) fleet

Royal National Lifeboat Institution lifeboats
Auxiliary search and rescue ship classes